Nazriya Nazim (born 20 December 1994) is an Indian actress, producer and former television presenter who works predominantly in Malayalam and Tamil films. She has won One Filmfare Award South, one Kerala State Film Awards, and One Tamil Nadu State Film Award respectively.

She started her career as an anchor on Malayalam television channel Asianet before pursuing a career as an actress. She made her debut as a child artist with Palunku (2006) and then as a lead actress in the 2013 Malayalam film Maad Dad. She has gone on to star in successful films such as Neram (2013), Raja Rani (2013), Ohm Shanthi Oshaana (2014),  and Bangalore Days (2014).

Following her marriage to actor Fahadh Faasil, she took a break from acting. She made a comeback in 2018 with Anjali Menon's movie Koode.

Early life and background
Nazriya was born to Nazimuddeen and Begum Beena. She has a brother, Naveen Nazim. Her family lived in Al Ain, UAE, before moving to Thiruvananthapuram.

She studied at Our Own English High School, Al Ain, UAE and at Christ Nagar School, Thiruvananthapuram and Sarvodaya Vidyalaya, Trivandrum. In 2013, she joined Mar Ivanios College, Thiruvananthapuram, but reportedly left the college, owing to her tight shooting schedules.

Film career
Nazriya started her career as an anchor in a Muslim oriented television quiz show named Punyamaasathiloode in 2005 on Kairali TV, following up with various other anchoring roles.

She then started her acting career in 2006 as a child artist in the Malayalam film Palunku (2006), directed by Blessy, in which she played the daughter of Mammootty's character. She went on to become an anchor on Asianet's popular music reality television show Munch Star Singer. The Mohanlal-starrer Oru Naal Varum (2010) was her next venture, in which she played Dhanya, the daughter of Sreenivasan's character. She was cast in an album titled Yuvvh by Sony Music Entertainment, alongside Nivin Pauly which became very popular among the youth.

Nazriya finally landed in her first female lead role in the Malayalam film Maad Dad (2013). She was associated with the team of Yuvvh—director Alphonse Putharen and actor Nivin Pauly— again for the romantic comedy thriller film Neram—which was simultaneously made in Tamil and Malayalam. The movie became a big success, and the lead pair was appreciated by both critics and audiences alike. The scene in which Nivin proposes to Nazriya acquired cult status among cinegoers. She received Vijay Award in the category of Best Debut Actress for her acting in Neram. She was then seen in Raja Rani, as an IT professional called Keerthana. Gautaman Bhaskaran from Hindustan Times wrote: "the one person who caught my attention was Nazriya Nazim, who as Arya's lover Keerthana, is absolutely gorgeous with a face that is so expressive that we do not need her to speak". Her next release was Naiyaandi, in which she played a dentist.

In 2014, she was first seen in Salalah Mobiles, which flopped despite having a strong star cast, including Dulquer Salmaan. She has completed filming for Thirumanam Enum Nikkah in Tamil, in which she acts as a Tamil Iyengar girl. She then did Ohm Shanthi Oshaana in Malayalam, sharing screen with Nivin Pauly. The film was a big hit, and became a blockbuster, running 50 days in almost all theatres.

Her next films were Bangalore Days and Samsaaram Aarogyathinu Haanikaram in Malayalam, Thirumanam Ennum Nikkah and Vaayai Moodi Pesavum in Tamil. Nazriya was signed to star in Nee Nalla Varuvada in October 2013. However, in March 2014, Kajal Aggarwal was signed on and replaced Nazriya. She won the best actress in the 45th Kerala State Film Awards.

Nazriya made a comeback with the Prithviraj-starrer, Anjali Menon film, Koode, after taking a break from films following her marriage to Fahadh Faasil. In 2020, she acted in the film Trance along with her husband after an year break. In 2022, she made her Telugu debut with the film Ante Sundaraniki alongside Nani.

Personal life

In January 2014, Malayalam film actor Fahadh Faasil announced to the media that he was set to marry Nazriya. The pair got to know each other more on the sets of Anjali Menon's Bangalore Days (2014), in which they played the roles of husband and wife. Fahadh and Nazriya revealed that their parents played a pivotal role in arranging the marriage. The pair was engaged in February 2014, before marrying on 21 August 2014 in Thiruvananthapuram.

Filmography

As actress

As producer

Television

Discography

Awards and nominations

Other awards

 2013 – Vanitha Film Award for Best Star Pair (shared with actor Nivin Pauly) for Neram
 2013 – Asiavision Awards – New Sensation in Acting
 2014 – Jaihind TV Film Awards for Upcoming Talent
 2014 – Asianet Film Award for Best Star Pair for Neram
 2013 – Edison Awards for Best Debut Actress for Neram
 2014 – Vikatan Awards For Best Debut Actress for Neram
 2014 – Vijay Award for Best Debut Actress for Neram
 2014 – Nominated – Filmfare Awards South for Best Actor Supporting Role Female for Raja Rani
 2014 – Filmfare Awards South for Best Debut (Female) for Neram
 2014 – Nominated – South Indian International Movie Awards for Best Female Debutant - Tamil for Neram
 2014 – Nominated – Asiavision Awards for Best Actress for Ohm Shanthi Oshaana and Bangalore Days
 2014 – Asiavision Awards for Outstanding Performance of the Year
 2015 – Nominated – 4th South Indian International Movie Awards for Best Female Debutant for Om Shanti Oshana
 2015 – Asianet Film Awards for Most Popular Actress for Ohm Shanthi Oshaana
 2015 – Nominated – Asianet Film Awards for Best Actress for Ohm Shanthi Oshaana
 2015 –  Vanitha Film Awards for Most Popular Actress for Ohm Shanthi Oshaana and Bangalore Days
 2015 – Nominated – Filmfare Award for Best Actress – Malayalam for Ohm Shanthi Oshaana
 2015 – Kerala State Film Award for Best Actress for Ohm Shanthi Oshaana and Bangalore Days
 2013 - Tamil Nadu State Film Award Special Prize for Neram
 2019:Nana Film awards for best second Actress for Koode
 2019 – Nominated - Kerala State Film Award for Best Actress for Koode
 2021 – Nominated - SIIMA Award for Best Film - Malayalam for C U Soon

References

External links

 
 
 
 

1994 births
Actresses from Thiruvananthapuram
Living people
Actresses in Malayalam cinema
Actresses in Tamil cinema
Indian film actresses
21st-century Indian actresses
Filmfare Awards South winners
Kerala State Film Award winners
Indian television actresses
Actresses in Malayalam television
Female models from Thiruvananthapuram
Women artists from Kerala
Child actresses in Malayalam cinema